Sean Curran (born August 23, 1977, in Springfield, Massachusetts) is an American politician who represented the 9th Hampden District in the Massachusetts House of Representatives from 2005 to 2015. After six terms he declined to seek re-election; his term will end January 7, 2015.

References

1977 births
Politicians from Springfield, Massachusetts
Saint Anselm College alumni
Suffolk University Law School alumni
Living people
Democratic Party members of the Massachusetts House of Representatives